Rudi Vata (born 13 February 1969) is an Albanian former professional footballer who played as a defender, and had also a short stint as a manager of Albanian team KF Vllaznia Shkodër.

Club career

Early life
Vata was born in the northern city of Shkodër and joined local side Vllaznia Shkodër at a young age, making his first team debut in 1988. Whilst travelling with the Albania national football team in France he sought political asylum in 1991.

Vata's career in Western football began in France in 1991, when the KS Dinamo Tirana player claimed political asylum following an international match. He played for Le Mans and Tours, before playing for Celtic between January 1993 and 1995–96. He became the first Albanian to win an honour in a major European country when he won the 1995 Scottish FA Cup with Celtic.

Vata went on to play for Apollon Limassol (1996–1998), Energie Cottbus (1998–2001), Rot-Weiß Ahlen (January–June 2002) and SK Tirana (2002–2003). This was followed by a spell in Japan, after which he signed for St Johnstone in 2004. He retired from football in 2005 after a brief stint with KF Partizani Tirana.

Since retiring from the professional game, Vata has become a sports agent, specialising in Eastern European football, and facilitating the transfer of players such as Garry O'Connor and Aiden McGeady.

International career
He made his debut for Albania in a May 1990 European Championship qualification match away against Iceland and earned a total of 59 caps, scoring 5 goals. His final international was a September 2001 FIFA World Cup qualification match against Finland.

Personal life
Vata is married to Anne Frances from Wishaw, Lanarkshire in Scotland, whom he met during his time playing at Celtic. They have two sons together, Ruan and Rocco, both of whom were born in Scotland. They live in Hamilton, Scotland.

In November 2019, his son Rocco was set to make his Republic of Ireland U-15 debut against Poland. Rocco then joined and progressed through the youth sector of Celtic (one of his father's former clubs), signing a professional contract with the Scottish team in July 2021.

Career statistics

Club

International

Honours
Dinamo Tirana
 Albanian Superliga: 1990

Celtic
 Scottish Cup: 1994–95

KF Tirana
 Albanian Superliga: 2003
 Albanian Supercup: 2002

Albania
 Malta International Tournament: 2000

References

External links
 Vata at Celtic FC - Football-Heroes.net
 
 

1969 births
Living people
Footballers from Shkodër
Albanian footballers
Association football defenders
Albania international footballers
KF Vllaznia Shkodër players
FK Dinamo Tirana players
Le Mans FC players
Tours FC players
Celtic F.C. players
Apollon Limassol FC players
FC Energie Cottbus players
Rot Weiss Ahlen players
KF Tirana players
Yokohama FC players
St Johnstone F.C. players
FK Partizani Tirana players
Ligue 2 players
Scottish Football League players
Cypriot First Division players
Bundesliga players
2. Bundesliga players
J2 League players
Albanian expatriate footballers
Expatriate footballers in France
Albanian expatriate sportspeople in France
Expatriate footballers in Scotland
Albanian expatriate sportspeople in Scotland
Expatriate footballers in Cyprus
Albanian expatriate sportspeople in Cyprus
Expatriate footballers in Germany
Albanian expatriate sportspeople in Germany
Expatriate footballers in Japan
Albanian expatriate sportspeople in Japan
Albanian football managers
KF Vllaznia Shkodër managers
Kategoria Superiore players
Kategoria Superiore managers
Association football agents